Marbled white may refer to:

 Melanargia galathea, a butterfly endemic to Europe, parts of Russia and Southwestern Asia, and Japan
 Hesperocharis graphites, a butterfly endemic to Guatemala and Mexico
 Nyctemera coleta, a moth found in southeast and east Asia
 Nyctemera adversata, a moth found in southeast and east Asia

Animal common name disambiguation pages